The 1982 CIAU Men's Soccer Championship was hosted by McGill University. The McGill Redmen won the gold medal game against the Victoria Vikings to claim the second men's soccer national championship in school history.

Some of the data is incomplete according to the 2008 CIS Soccer Almanac.

All-Canadians
First Team(1-11) and Second Team(12-22) with school and hometown.

Nationals
Semi-final

Final

References

2008 CIS Soccer Almanac

U Sports men's soccer championship
Cis Mens Soccer Championship, 1982